How High the Moon: Live at the Viper Room is the first live album of the American rock band Masters of Reality, released in 1997.

The album was retitled Reality Show for a European re-release in 2002.

Track listing 
All songs by Chris Goss, except where noted.
"How High the Moon"
"The Blue Garden" (Goss, Harrington)
"Alder Smoke Blues"
"Doraldina's Prophecies" (Goss, Harrington)
"She Got Me (When She Got Her Dress On)"
"Jindalee Jindalie"
"John Brown (Goss, Harrington)"
"Tilt-A-Whirl/Swingeroo Joe" (Goss, Googe)
"Ants in the Kitchen" (Baker, Goss) / "Goin' Down" (Don Nix)
"100 Years (Of Tears on the Wind)"

Credits
Chris Goss - Vocals, Guitar
Googe - Bass
Victor Indrizzo - Drums, Vocals
Brendon McNichol - Guitar
Chris Johnson - Keyboards

Additional personnel 
Scott Weiland - Vocals on 'Jindalee Jindalie'

References

Masters of Reality albums
Albums produced by Chris Goss
1997 live albums